How Newtown Prepared is an American musical comedy staged in 1916 by the Tutt Brothers. It toured. The storyline features African American veterans of the American Civil War tricked into fighting, on the “wrong” side in the Spanish American War. Characters depicted included George Washington Bullion, who was part of previous Tutt brother farces including George Washington Bullion (1910) and George Washington Bullion Abroad (1915). The show had an African American cast.

It was scheduled to play at the Academy of Music in Richmond, Virginia. It was also booked at the Opera House in Americus, Georgia. The show starred the Tutt brothers as well as Blanche Thompson along with a large supporting cast. T. L. Corwell was announced as the show’s manager. It was billed for the Brandeis Theater in Omaha, Nebraska which advertised it above an upcoming screen of The Birth of a Nation.

The Paragon Ragtime Orchestra recorded a Clarence G. Wilson song from the show titled Zoo-Step. It is on the album Black Manhattan, Volume 3.

References

Musical comedy plays
Plays about war
1916 musicals
Spanish–American War fiction